The 2022 Brest Challenger was a professional tennis tournament played on hard courts. It was the seventh edition of the tournament which was part of the 2022 ATP Challenger Tour. It took place in Brest, France between 24 and 30 October 2022.

Singles main-draw entrants

Seeds

 1 Rankings are as of 17 October 2022.

Other entrants
The following players received wildcards into the singles main draw:
  Gabriel Debru
  Titouan Droguet
  Arthur Fils

The following players received entry into the singles main draw as alternates:
  Alexey Vatutin
  Otto Virtanen
  Denis Yevseyev

The following players received entry from the qualifying draw:
  Duje Ajduković
  Mathias Bourgue
  Kenny de Schepper
  Evgeny Donskoy
  Sascha Gueymard Wayenburg
  Tristan Lamasine

The following players received entry as lucky losers:
  Viktor Durasovic
  Beibit Zhukayev

Champions

Singles

  Grégoire Barrère def.  Luca Van Assche 6–3, 6–3.

Doubles

  Viktor Durasovic /  Otto Virtanen def.  Filip Bergevi /  Petros Tsitsipas 6–4, 6–4.

References

2022 ATP Challenger Tour
2022 in French tennis
October 2022 sports events in France
Brest Challenger